Little Voice (also known as Her Voice in Europe) is an American romantic comedy-drama television series created by Sara Bareilles and Jessie Nelson for Apple TV+. The series premiered on July 10, 2020. In August 2021, the series was canceled after one season.

Premise
Little Voice explores "the universal journey of finding your authentic voice in your early 20s. It is described as a fresh, intensely romantic tale of the search to find your true voice...and then the courage to use it."

Cast

Main
 Brittany O'Grady as Bess Alice King
 Sean Teale as Ethan
 Colton Ryan as Samuel
 Shalini Bathina as Prisha
 Kevin Valdez as Louie King
 Phillip Johnson Richardson as Benny

Recurring
 Chuck Cooper as Percy King
 Nadia Mohebban as Ananya
 Sam Lazarus as Phil
 Mark Blane as Zack
 Andrew Duff as Ted
 Ned Eisenberg as Al
 Samrat Chakrabarti as Anil
 Gopal Divan as Sundeep
 Sakina Jaffrey as Vilina
 Luke Kirby as Jeremy
 June Squibb as Mrs. Daisy Finch
 Becky Ann Baker as Elaine

Episodes

Production

Development
On June 6, 2018, it was announced that Apple had given the production a straight-to-series order for a first season consisting of ten episodes. The pilot episode was written and directed by Jessie Nelson, who would also executive produce alongside Sara Bareilles, J. J. Abrams, and Ben Stephenson. Along with Nelson, other directors for the series include Cherien Dabis, Bart Freundlich, Christopher Storer, and Emma Westenberg. Nelson was also expected to act as the series' showrunner, and Bareilles wrote original songs for the series. Production companies involved with the series include Warner Bros. Television and Bad Robot Productions. On August 4, 2021, Apple canceled the series after one season.

Casting
In October 2019, it was announced Brittany O'Grady, Shalini Bathina, Sean Teale, and Colton Ryan had joined the cast of the series as main cast members. At the same time, it was announced that Samrat Chakrabarti, Gopal Divan, Sakina Jaffrey, and Emma Hong would also be joining the cast. On May 21, 2020, it was announced that Kevin Valdez, Phillip Johnson Richardson, and Chuck Cooper would also star in the series.

Release
On May 21, 2020, it was announced that the series would premiere on July 10, 2020. On June 12, 2020, the official trailer for the series was released.

Critical response
On review aggregator Rotten Tomatoes, Little Voice holds a 77% approval rating based on 30 reviews, with an average rating of 5.88/10. The website's critical consensus reads, "Little Voice's earnest tune is a little too familiar, but a winsome cast led by Brittany O'Grady and catchy music from Sara Bareilles make for a breezy summer binge." Metacritic gave the series a weighted average score of 60 out of 100 based on 18 reviews, indicating "mixed or average reviews".

Carolyn Siede of The A.V. Club gave the first season a B− for some good and uplifting performances but a scattered performance by Brittany O'Grady and excessive storylines.

More Love: Songs from Little Voice Season One
More Love: Songs from Little Voice Season One is an album by American pop artist Sara Bareilles released on Epic Records on September4, 2020. The release is also a soundtrack to the first season of Little Voice. The album is made up of recordings by Bareilles of the songs she recorded for the cast of the series. The album reached 32 in its one-week on Billboards Album Sales chart on September 19.

Track listing
"I Don't Know Anything" (Bareilles)– 3:13
"More Love" (Jack Antonoff and Bareilles)– 3:50
"King of the Lost Boys" (Bareilles, Jason Blynn, Earl the Squirrel, and Peter William Harper)– 4:34
"Dear Hope" (Bareilles)– 4:22
"Ghost Light" (Bareilles)– 4:18
"Simple and True" (Bareilles)– 3:39
"Coming Back to You" (Bareilles)– 3:56
"In July" (Jack DeBose and Samora Pinderhughes)– 4:04
"Tell Her" (Bareilles, Hillary Lindsey, Lori McKenna, and Justin Trantor)– 4:58
"Little Voice" (Bareilles)– 4:24

References

External links
 

2020 American television series debuts
2020 American television series endings
2020s American comedy-drama television series
2020s American romantic comedy television series
Apple TV+ original programming
Autism in television
English-language television shows
Sara Bareilles
Television series by Bad Robot Productions
Television series by Warner Bros. Television Studios
Television series about fictional musicians